Brit Shalom (lit.

History
Brit Shalom sought peaceful coexistence between Arabs and Jews, to be achieved by renunciation of the Zionist aim of creating a Jewish state. The alternative vision of Zionism was to create a centre for Jewish cultural life in Palestine, echoing the earlier ideas of Ahad Ha'am. At the time, Brit Shalom supported the establishment of a bi-national state where Jews and Arabs would have equal rights.

Brit Shalom supporters and founders included economist and sociologist Arthur Ruppin, philosopher Martin Buber, Hugo Bergmann, historian Hans Kohn, Gershom Scholem, Henrietta Szold and  Israel Jacob Kligler. Albert Einstein also voiced support.  Judah Leon Magnes,  one of the authors of the program, never joined the organization.

A letter from Arthur Ruppin to Hans Kohn in May 1930 states:

Ruppin held a senior position within the Jewish Agency as Director of the Palestine Land Development Company. Most Palestinian Jews and Arabs rejected the proposed binational solution, and Ruppin himself eventually became convinced it was unrealistic. The group disintegrated by the early 1930s. 

In 1942, Magnes and supporters of Brit Shalom formed the political party Ihud which also advocated binationalism.

See also 
 Arab–Israeli peace projects
 Peace process in the Israeli–Palestinian conflict
 Sectarian conflict in Mandatory Palestine
 Cultural Zionism
 One-state solution

References

External links
 Official Brit Shalom / Tahalof Essalam web site

Politics of Mandatory Palestine
Middle East peace efforts
Jewish organizations in Mandatory Palestine
Organizations established in 1925
1925 establishments in Mandatory Palestine
Organizations disestablished in the 1930s
1930s disestablishments in Mandatory Palestine